Derry Area High School is a public high school in Derry, Pennsylvania, United States. It is part of the Derry Area School District.

Mission Statement 
"The mission of the Derry Area School District is to develop responsible citizens and life-long learners who are prepared to adapt and succeed in a global society."

Campus 
Derry Area High School is located at 988 North Chestnut Street Derry, Pennsylvania 15627.  The facility on campus include a baseball field, football field, soccer field, tennis courts, a full weight room, a swimming pool, a high school gymnasium, and the Adams Memorial Library.

Athletics

Teams 
Derry's athletic teams are nicknamed the Trojans and the school's colors are blue and gold. Derry teams compete in the following sports:

 Baseball
 Softball
 Football
 Co-ed swimming
 Co-ed track
 boys' cross country
 girls' cross country
 boys' soccer
 girls' soccer
 boys' basketball
 girls' basketball
 girls' tennis
 boys' volleyball
 girls' volleyball
 boys' golf
 girls' golf
 boys' wrestling

State championships 

 boys' volleyball
 1986 PIAA State Champions
 1988 PIAA State Champions
 1995 PIAA State Champions

References

External links 
 

Schools in Westmoreland County, Pennsylvania
Public high schools in Pennsylvania